Berlin lebt ("Berlin is alive") is the fourth studio album by German rapper Capital Bra. The triple album, consisting of the standard version, instrumentals and the EP 5 Songs in einer Nacht was released on 22 June 2018, by Team Kuku and distributed by Sony Music. The album features guest appearances by Ufo361, Farid Bang, KC Rebell, Bausa and AK Ausserkontrolle among others.

The album produced four singles, including "5 Songs in einer Nacht", "Neymar", "One Night Stand" and "Berlin lebt", all of which reached number one in Germany. Every single was supported by a music video, shot by Fati.TV The album debuted at number one in Germany.

Background and singles
Capital Bra announced the album on 26 March 2018, through a teaser which features him performing in front of the Brandenburg Gate in Berlin. The first single of the album, "5 Songs of einer Nacht" was released on 6 April 2018. The single became Balovatsky's first single to top the German single charts on 13 April 2018. The second single "Neymar" featuring Ufo361 was released three weeks later. The track again topped the charts in Germany and in Austria. It also broke the record for the most streamed German song within a week. "One Night Stand" and "Berlin lebt" were released in May and June, respectively. Both reached the top on the German and Austrian single charts.

Track listing
Credits adapted from Tidal.

Charts

Weekly charts

Year-end charts

Certifications

Release history

References

Capital Bra albums
2018 albums
Music videos directed by Fati.tv